The FMW Brass Knuckles Tag Team Championship was a tag team hardcore wrestling championship contested in Frontier Martial-Arts Wrestling.

Title history

Names

Reigns

References

Frontier Martial-Arts Wrestling championships
Hardcore wrestling championships
Tag team wrestling championships
Battlarts championships